Cross check may refer to:
 CrossCheck, a coalition set up to support truth and verification in media
 Cross-checking, an infraction in the sport of ice hockey
 Cross-check, a chess tactic of blocking a Check with a check to force the exchange of pieces
 The Interstate Voter Registration Crosscheck Program, a former voter registration list maintenance program in the United States
 A crossed cheque is a cheque (monetary instrument)  that has been marked to specify an instruction about the way it is to be redeemed.